The Konkapot River is a  river in southwestern Massachusetts and northern Connecticut. It is a tributary of the Housatonic River, not to be confused with the smaller Konkapot Brook in Stockbridge (another Housatonic tributary).

The river was named for Captain John Konkapot, an Indian chief.

It then runs south to the Connecticut border near East Sheffield, Massachusetts, and then primarily west to its confluence with the Housatonic River in Ashley Falls, Massachusetts. About  of the river are within Massachusetts, with the remainder in Connecticut.

The river powered mills in Monterey and several villages of New Marlborough, Massachusetts, including grist and cider mills, a box factory, and three major paper mills. As many as 15 mills were built along one three-mile stretch, although they did not operate simultaneously. It still suffers from mercury pollution.

See also
List of rivers of Connecticut

References

External links
 Housatonic Valley Association

Rivers of Berkshire County, Massachusetts
Rivers of Hartford County, Connecticut
New Marlborough, Massachusetts
Monterey, Massachusetts
Sheffield, Massachusetts
Rivers of Massachusetts
Rivers of Connecticut
Tributaries of Housatonic River